This is a list of the oldest verified dogs in the world, listed by age, all of whom have attained the minimum age of 20. Aging in dogs depends on breed, size and diet.

Longest living dogs verified by age

See also
 List of individual dogs
 List of oldest cats
 List of longest-living organisms
 Uncle Chichi and Max – two unofficial world's oldest dogs

References

Notes

External links

Dogs, oldest
Oldest dogs
Oldest animals